Anthony Ryan may refer to:

Anthony Ryan (bobsleigh) (born 1980), Australian bobsledder
Anthony Ryan (Treasury official), United States banker
Anthony Ryan (writer), British fantasy writer
Tony Ryan (1936–2007), co-founder of Ryanair
Tony Ryan (scientist) (born 1962), polymer chemist and broadcaster

See also
Ryan Anthony (1969–2020), American trumpet player